Bruno Masure (born 14 October 1947) is a French journalist, news anchor and television presenter.

Early life and education 
Bruno Masure was born in Lille in the department of Nord. He graduated with a degree in history, economic science and political science. He also graduated at the Institut d'urbanisme de Paris.

Career 
Masure began his career working for the tutorial at the Faculté de droit de Lille. He then did an internship at the political service of the daily newspaper Le Monde. He later became a political journalist on RMC from 1973 to 1975 and on TF1 since 1975, where he covered the campaign of François Mitterrand in 1981.

A famous reporter on TF1, Masure hosted the Journal de 20 heures from July 1984 to July 1990. From September 1990 to October 1997, he hosted the Journal de 20 heures on Antenne 2 which later became France 2 in 1992.

From 1999 to 2003, Masure was a columnist in the program Vivement dimanche prochain hosted by Michel Drucker on the same channel. He was from 2005 to 2011 a journalist and columnist on France Inter in the program Le Fou du roi with Stéphane Bern.

Books 
 La télé rend fou... mais j'me soigne !, Plon, 1987
 À pleins tubes, Orban, 1989
 Le dictionnaire analphabétique, Orban, 1990
 Leurre de vérité, Plon, 1993
 Débloc notes, Plon, 1998
 Chérie, pense à changer de millénaire, Plon, 2000
 Loft présidentiel, Plon, 2002
 Un dernier vers pour la route, Plon, 2002
 Comment se fait-ce ?, Presses de la Cité, 2004
 Enquête sur mon assassinat, Chiflet & Cie, 2006
 Les chats, Hugo Image, 2007
 Journalistes à la niche ? : De Pompidou à Sarkozy, chronique des liaisons dangereuses entre médias et politiques, Hugo et Compagnie, 2009
 Le journal d'une curée de campagne, Chiflet & Cie, 2011
 La télé rend définitivement fou, Chiflet & Cie, 2015

Honours 
Bruno Masure received a 7 d'Or for the best presenter of the daily news in 1988, 1990, 1993, 1995 and 1998.

References 

1947 births
Living people
French television presenters
French journalists
Mass media people from Lille
French male non-fiction writers